Jameh Shuran-e Sofla (also Romanized as Jāmeh Shūrān-e Soflá) is a village in Qarah Su Rural District, in the Central District of Kermanshah County, Kermanshah Province, Iran. At the 2006 census, its population was 191, in 38 families.

References 

Populated places in Kermanshah County